Anniella stebbinsi, the Southern California legless lizard, is a small, slender lizard, and, as the name suggests, is legless. Not much is known about the Southern California legless lizard as a separate species, with most observations conducted while it was not recognised as separate from Anniella pulchra.

Etymology
The specific name stebbinsi honors Robert C. Stebbins, an American herpetologist.

Description 
The Southern California legless lizard is small and slender, with no legs, a shovel-shaped snout, smooth shiny scales, and a blunt tail. On close observation, eyelids are also present, making clear that the species are lizards and not snakes. Its dorsum is light olive-brown, with strong yellow sides, and its ventral colour is moderate yellow. It also has a black mid-dorsal stripe with the length of less than one scale wide that stretches from the parietals to the tip of the tail, and multiple black stripes that are one scale wide from the eye to the tip of the tail.

Distribution  
This species is found in southern California (USA) and northern Baja California (Mexico).

Habitat and conservation 
The Southern California legless lizard is found in a wider range of habitat than any other species in the genus, mostly found in coastal sand dunes and a variety of interior habitats, including sandy washes and alluvial fans. They live mostly underground, burrowing in the loose, sandy soil. However, much of the coastal dune habitat has been destroyed by coastal development between Ventura County and the Mexican Border. However, a large protected population persists in the remnant of the once extensive El Segundo Dunes at the Los Angeles International Airport.

As of March 2017, the International Union for Conservation of Nature (IUCN) has not assessed this species for the IUCN Red List.

References 

Anniella
Legless lizards
Reptiles of Mexico
Reptiles of the United States
Reptiles described in 2013
Taxa named by Theodore Johnstone Papenfuss